Asesinato a distancia (English: "Murdered at distance") is a 1998 Argentine crime drama film written and directed by Santiago Carlos Oves and starring Martín Adjemián, Héctor Alterio, Patricio Contreras and Laura Novoa. The film premiered on 12 February 1998 in Buenos Aires.

Synopsis
When a detective investigates the suicide of a man, he finds that it may be a murder, and everybody seems to be a suspect.

Cast
 Martín Adjemián ... Comisario Giménez
 Héctor Alterio ... Silverio Punes
 Elvia Andreoli ... Regina
 Patricio Contreras ... Daniel Hernández
 Miguel Dedovich ... Braulio
 Omar Galvan ... Loco
 Guillermo Hermida ... Osvaldo
 Horacio Marassi ... Sebastián
 Laura Novoa ... Herminia
 Gerardo Peyrano ... Ricardo
 Fabián Vena ... Lázaro
 Carlos Webber

External links
 

1998 films
1990s Spanish-language films
1998 crime drama films
Argentine crime drama films
1990s Argentine films